Buck Rasmussen (born October 1, 1978) is a former American football defensive lineman of the National Football League (NFL).

Rasmussen played college football at the University of Nebraska Omaha.

On May 2, 2003, he signed with the New England Patriots as an undrafted free agent. On August 24, 2003, he was released by the Patriots. On February 6, 2004, he re-signed with the team.

On May 30, 2005, he signed with the Winnipeg Blue Bombers of the Canadian Football League (CFL).

References 

1978 births
Living people
Nebraska–Omaha Mavericks football players
New England Patriots players
Winnipeg Blue Bombers players
People from Tekamah, Nebraska
Players of American football from Nebraska